3-Methylglutaconyl-CoA (MG-CoA), also known as β-methylglutaconyl-CoA, is an intermediate in the metabolism of leucine.  It is metabolized into HMG-CoA.

Leucine metabolism

See also
 Methylcrotonyl-CoA carboxylase
 Methylglutaconyl-CoA hydratase

References

Organophosphates
Thioesters of coenzyme A